Holy Cross Church, Gampaha  is a Roman Catholic church located in Gampaha, Sri Lanka Its was founded in 1916 as a parish church of the Archdiocese of Colombo. The church is nicknamed "Gal Palliya/ගල් පල්ලිය" meaning "Rock Church" since the church facade is encrusted with gneiss stone.

History

A Holy Cross Church was known to be located near the heart of Gampaha during the Portuguese ruling period in Sri Lanka(1505–1658). This was during the reign of King Rajasingha II (1629–1687), the third king of the Kingdom of Kandy in Sri Lanka.

In 1658 the Dutch expelled Portuguese and took control over some parts of Sri Lanka. The Dutch era was known to be a disastrous time for Sri Lankan Catholics since they were opposed to the Roman Catholicism and other traditional religions. The original church was abandoned and was completely ruined.

On 7 May 1916, the groundbreaking was done for a new church building under the guidance of Rev.Fr. Gregorius Silva, the Head of Weliweriya deanery. The church was completed and opened to the public in 1918.

Apostolic blessing
An Apostolic Blessing certificate was received from Pope John Paul II for the 75th anniversary of Holy Cross Church in 1991.

Relics held

Tiny wood fragment from the very own cross which Jesus died is kept away from elements inside a solar monstrance inspired reliquary.

Parish priests and assistant priests

Assistant priests

Namesakes
Other Holy Cross Churches in the Archdiocese of Colombo, Sri Lanka;

 Holy Cross Church, Pulasthigama, Anuradhapura
 Holy Cross Church, Kalutara
 Holy Cross Church, Mahahunupitiya, Negombo
 Holy Cross Church, Mirigama
 Holy Cross Church, Tarala, Pugoda

References

 75th Holy Cross Church Anniversary Souvenir - 1991 September
 The Archdiocese of Colombo
 Christian Aggression
 Religion and Nationalism in Nineteenth Century Sri Lanka - Christian Missionaries and Their Critics (A Review Article by K M de Silva)

Churches in Gampaha
Roman Catholic churches in Sri Lanka
Tourist attractions in Western Province, Sri Lanka
20th-century Roman Catholic church buildings in Sri Lanka
Churches in Gampaha District